The FM-11 (Fujitsu Micro 11) was a business computer announced by Fujitsu in November 1982. It is a higher-end model of their previous FM-8 computer, and was released simultaneously with the mass-market FM-7 machine. The FM-11 series was intended to be used in offices.

Japanese characters can be displayed within a 16×16 pixels matrix.

The FM-11 range was replaced by the 16-bit FM-16β series by the mid-1980s.

Models
 1982 — FM-11 EX: 6809 & 8088 dual microprocessors
 1982 — FM-11 AD: 6809 microprocessor only
 1982 — FM-11 ST: economic version of the AD, with FDD as an option. Built-in ROM Basic.
 1984 — FM-11 BS: 8088 microprocessor only
 1984 — FM-11 AD2, OS-9 operating system
 1985 — FM-11 AD2+: enhanced AD2 (256 KB RAM)

Emulator
Multi Emulator Super System for Windows/Linux/Mac includes an FM-11 emulator.

References

External links
 Old-Computers.com Page

Fujitsu computers
8086-based home computers
Personal computers